Hindi wedding songs are a major genre of Bollywood songs. They often form the backdrop of some very memorable emotional or joyful scenes in Hindi movies. They are often played during Indian, and other South Asian weddings.

Traditional wedding music
In North Western India, shehnai is considered to be the musical instrument announcing a wedding procession. Its South Indian counterpart is nadaswaram. In Northwestern India, a dhol drum is generally played.

Popular wedding songs

These are some of most memorable Hindi wedding songs from Hindi movies. Many of them are frequently quoted. Several of them have been rerecorded as remixes and some of them have inspired names of later Hindi movies. They are played during weddings and are often used to accompany dancing.

In addition there are many folk songs in several dialects of Hindi regarding weddings; singing, especially by women, has been a tradition. Many of the film songs were inspired by folk songs.

Mehndi
 Mehndi Laga Ke Rakhna  (Dilwale Dulhania Le Jayenge, 1995)
Keep her ready with mehndi...
 Mehendi Hai Rachne Wali (Zubeidaa, 2001)
"Desi Girl" (Dostana)

Anticipation
 Meri Bano Ki Aayegi Baraat (Aaina, 1993)
My banno's (bride to be) baraat will arrive...
 Raja Ki Aayegi Baraat (Aah, 1953)
The barat of my prince will come...
 Meri Pyari Behania banegi dulhaniya (Sachaa Jhutha, 1970)
My dear sister will be a bride...
"Sar Se Sarki Sarki Chunariya" (Silsila (1981 film))
 Banno Rani Tumhe Sayani (1947 Earth)
 Ye Teri Aankhen Jhuki Jhuki (Fareb (1996 film))

Baraat arrival
Also see Hindi dance songs

 Din Shagna Da (Phillauri, 2017)

Translation: The auspicious day has arrived...

 Le Jayenge Le Jayenge (Chor Machaye Shor, 1974)
They will come and take her...
 Aaj Mere Yaar Ki Shaadi Hai (Aadmi Sadak Ka, 1977)
Today, my friend is getting married...
 Baharo Phool Barsao (Suraj, 1966)
O spring breeze, sprinkle flowers...
 "Pyaara Bhaiya Mera " (Kya Kehna ) 2000)
My Brothers Come As A Groom
 "lo chali mein apne devar ki barat le ke (hum apke hai koun)"
  "bachna aie hasino lo main aa gaya"
  Tenu leke (Salaam-E-Ishq, 2007)

Humour and teasing
These are humorous songs that ridicule the baraatis:

 Jute de do paise lelo (Hum Aapke Hain Koun..!, 1994)

OK, take the money, now give back the shoes...
 Sasural Genda phool (Delhi 6, 2009)
In-laws' house is like marigold flowers...
 Didi Tera Devar Deewana (Hum Aapke Hain Kaun, 1994)
Sister Your Brother In Law Is Crazy

 Zoor Ka Jatka (Action Replay, 2010) 
Wedding is a sudden life jolt, marriage is punishment for life, you will be sad for life, it is better to hang oneself than to marry
 Bhootni Ke (Singh is King, 2008) 
Who made you a groom, you son of a witch
 fuly fatu faltu 
 Rukmani Rukmani (Roja, 1992)
 Main Joru Ka Ghulam (Joru Ka Ghulam, 2000)
 Gal Mithi Mitthi Bol (Aisha, 2010)
 Jodi Ye Jachdi Nai (Gadar, 2001)
This couple doesn't fit well together

Bridal singer
 Bindiya Chamkegi (Do Raaste, 1969)
My bindi will shine...
 Ai Meri Zohra Jabeen, (Waqt, 1965)
O my bright faced!...
 Badan pe sitare lapete hue (Prince, 1969)
With stars wrapped around you...
 Yeh Chaand Sa Roshan Chehra (Kashmir Ki Kali, 1964)
This face shining like the moon...
 Chaudhvin Ka Chand ho (Chaudhvin Ka Chand, 1960)
Are you full moon...

Making a commitment for life
 Jab koi baat bigad jaaye (Jurm, 1990)
When something will go wrong...keep me company...
 Aap Ki Nazron Ne Samjha (Anpadh, 1962)
In your eyes, I am worthy of love...
 Tum Agar Saath Dene Ka Vada Karo (Hamraaz, 1967)
If you promise to keep me company...
 Joh Wada Kiya (Taj Mahal)
What you have promised, you will have to...
 O sathi re (Muqaddar Ka Sikandar, 1978)
O my companion, what will be life without you...
 Jis Gali Mein Tera Ghar (Kati Patang)
May I not take the road, where your home is not...

The phere
 Jab Tak Pure Na Ho Phere Saat (Nadiya Ke Paar, 1982)
Until the seven rounds have been taken...
 Tare Hain Barati  {Virasat}

The joining
 Kabhi Kabhie Mere Dil Mein (Kabhi Kabhi, 1976)
Sometimes I think, you were made for me...
 Mera Yaar Dildaar Bada Sona (Jaanwar, 1999))
My beloved friend, so enticing...
 Nain Se Nain naahin (Jhanak Jhanak Payal Baje, 1955)
Don't look at me...

Blessings
 Mubaarak Ho tumko yeh shaadi tumhaari (Haan Maine Bhi Pyaar Kiya, 2002)

Vidai

 Bābul ki duāye leti jā (Neel Kamal, 1968)
Take your daddy's blessings...
 Yeh Galiyan Yeh Chaubarafaisal khan atanga chandpur (Prem Rog, 1982)
These lanes and squares...you will not come here again...
 Pi Ke Ghar Aaj Pyari Dulhaniya Chali (Mother India, 1957)
For her beloved's home, the lovely bride leaves...
 Babul ka ye ghar behna ek dinka thikana hai (Daata, 1989)
This father's home is just a day's stay, my sister
 Baabul Jo Tumne Sikhaya...Sajan Ghar Mein Chali Hum Apke Hai Kaun
 kehta hai babul babul
 Kabira (Encore) (Yeh Jawaani Hai Deewani, 2013)

Arrival of the newlyweds
 Main to bhuul chalii baabul ka des (Saraswatichandra, 1968)
I have started to forget my daddy's country...

 Aaye Ho Meri Zindagi Main (Raja Hindustani,1996)
 Mere Hathon Main Nau Nau Chodiyan (Chandni, 1989)
I have nine bangles in each of my hands...
 Baalam Se Milan Hoga (Chaudhvin Ka Chand, 1960)
The day has come, you will meet your beloved...
Ghunghat Nahin Kholungi (Mother India, 1957)
 Ye haseen vaadiyaan, ye khula aasmaan...aagaye hum kahaan, ae mere jaanejaa... (Roja, 1992)

Together forever
Ek Bangla Bane Nyaara (President, 1937)
Let there be a new house...
 Chalo Dildar Chalo (Pakeezah, 1972)
Come, my beloved, come...
 Tere mere sapane, ab yek rang hain (Guide, 1965)
Now my dreams and yours, are the same color...
Ham Jab Honge Saath Saal Ke (Kal Aaj Aur Kal, 1971)
When I will be 60, and you 55....
Hum Tum Yug Yug Se (Milan)
For many many eons, both of us...

See also 
 Hindu wedding
 Punjabi wedding traditions
 Indian wedding photography
 Wedding music
 Hindi dance music

References 

Indian wedding
Indian songs

Wedding songs
Filmi
Hindi film songs
Hindi cinema